Gordon J. Stanley (1 July 1921 –  17 December 2001) was a New Zealand-born radio astronomer who with John G. Bolton in 1947, discovered the first radio star, Cygnus A.

Stanley was born in Cambridge, New Zealand. By the 1940s he was working in radio astronomy with Bolton, where they discovered the first radio star.

In 1955 Stanley went to the California Institute of Technology (Caltech) where he became the director of the Owens Valley Radio Observatory.

References

New Zealand emigrants to Australia
20th-century Australian astronomers
Australian expatriates in the United States
1921 births
2001 deaths